Lepani Nabuliwaqa (born 4 June 1980, in Suva), nicknamed Leps, is a Fijian rugby union footballer.  He plays as a wing.

Career
Nabuliwaqa was an influential member of the Red Rock sevens team which participated in Fiji domestic sevens competition in 2003-04 season. He made his debut for the Fiji sevens team when he replaced Vima Tuidraki at the 2006 USA Sevens. He copped a six-week ban for a dangerous tackle but still he made the 12-man squad for the Commonwealth Games in Melbourne. He took over as the playmaker in the 2005/06 IRB Sevens World Series and became one of Fiji's star performers. He was later given the Digicel Fiji sevens best player award ahead of Sireli Naqelevuki and Dale Tonawai at the Fiji Rugby Union annual awards. Nabuliwaqa played 15s and 7s for Nakasi, and was recruited by Lote Rasiga into the Red Rock team at the Nataleira 7s tournament joining the likes of Sireli Bobo, Manasa Bola, Neumi Cakacaka and Aporosa Dauvucu.

For the 2012 and 2013 season played 15s for The South Darwin Rabbitohs, and made Sevens appearances for the Country King Browns. Leps has been named in the Squad for the King Browns in the 2014 Hottest Sevens In Darwin, Australia.

References

External links
 

1980 births
Living people
Fijian rugby union players
Rugby union wings
Rugby union centres
Male rugby sevens players
Commonwealth Games bronze medallists for Fiji
Rugby sevens players at the 2006 Commonwealth Games
Fiji international rugby sevens players
Sportspeople from Suva
I-Taukei Fijian people
Commonwealth Games medallists in rugby sevens
Commonwealth Games rugby sevens players of Fiji
Medallists at the 2006 Commonwealth Games